Poojappura is a suburb  of Thiruvananthapuram (Trivandrum) in India.  It is located in the south-east part of the city, surrounded by Jagathi, Karamana, Mudavanmugal and Thirumala. This place was once used as the worship place during the Navaratri festival season. The name Poojappura comes from the fact that it was here that the King of Travancore used to arrive during Mahanavami celebrations for the pooja (worship). There is the biggest Kavadi Procession on Vijayadeshami day with over 700 Kavadis, Paravakavadi, Suryakavadi, Mayilkavadi, Agnikavadi etc.

Poojappura is known for housing the Central Prison (Central Jail) of Kerala. The central jail is one of the oldest in the state and was built by British Engineers during Travancore Reign.
The State Education Department (Pareeksha Bhavan), Head Office of HLL Lifecare Limited (formerly Hindustan Latex Limited), Head Office of State Bank of Travancore, Bharatheeyam Charitable Trust is located here.

Notable persons
 
 
 Mohanlal
 M. Jayachandran - music composer
 Gopinath Muthukad - magician who established the Magic Academy at Poojappura
 Nelliyode Vasudevan Namboodiri - Kathakali artist
 Padmarajan - Malayalam film director
 Namitha Pramod - actress 
 Priyadarshan - Indian film director 
 Shobhana - Actress and Dancer 
 Poojappura Ravi - Malayalam comedian actor
 G. Shankar - architect
 Prithviraj Sukumaran - Malayalam Film Actor

References

Suburbs of Thiruvananthapuram